Philip Cassidy (born 15 October 1961) is an Irish former cyclist. He competed at the 1984 Summer Olympics and the 1988 Summer Olympics. He was the winner of Rás Tailteann in 1983 and 1999.

References

External links
 

1961 births
Living people
Irish male cyclists
Olympic cyclists of Ireland
Cyclists at the 1984 Summer Olympics
Cyclists at the 1988 Summer Olympics
Place of birth missing (living people)
Rás Tailteann winners